Wojciech Daniel Cejrowski (born 27 June 1964 in Elbląg) is a Polish radio journalist, satirist, photographer, traveller, author of books and press publications, artistic director of the Discover World library, member of The Explorers Club.

Education
Cejrowski graduated from the XVII High School by the name of Andrzej Frycz Modrzewski in Warsaw. In 2010 he received a BA in sociology from Catholic University of Lublin. Cejrowski studied also without graduating at Aleksander Zelwerowicz State Theatre Academy; University of Warsaw, Santa Clara University.

Career

Radio
Cejrowski started his radio career in 1991 – along with Korneliusz Pacuda he conducted the program Czy jest miejsce na country w Polsce? (Is There a Place for country music in Poland?). One of its results was a contract with American ABC Network – since 1992 all Polish local broadcasting stations had started to broadcast Polish version of American Country Countdown. Wojciech Cejrowski (at the beginning along with Korneliusz Pacuda) was hosting this broadcast for eleven years. The very last one (No. 519) was broadcast in January 2003. In 1993 Wojciech Cejrowski was offered the job by Wojciech Mann and Krzysztof Materna, owners of the private radio station Radio Kolor (Radio Color). First he hosted his own music programme then also famous Aeroplan (Airplane) together with Beata Pawlikowska and then his leading morning programme (every Saturday from 6 to 10 am – which later gave the beginning to WC Kwadrans). His cooperation with Radio Kolor ended in 1997 (soon after Mann and Materna left the radio station and some changes for worse were made). He worked for Radio WAW-a for next 3 years (1997–1999). These days Cejrowski's radio broadcasts can be found in various public and private broadcasting stations in Poland. The best known is his traveler cycle Po drugiej stronie globusa (On the Other Side of the Globe) – it's more than 300 episodes that were broadcast by Radio Station 1, Radio dla Ciebie, Radio Koszalin, Radio Merkury, Radio PiK and Radio Network PLUS. He also works for Polish Radio Station 1. He sends his correspondences from foreign countries for Z pierwszej ręki (First Hand) and Radio Kierowców (The Driver's Radio) and his traveler's stories for Lato z Radiem (Summer with Radio). During 2005 winter season Wojciech Cejrowski hosted the Zima z radiową Jedynką (Winter with Radio Station One). In the meantime since 2003 he has been creating music broadcasts on the demand of Music Editorial Office – Muzyka na Molo (Music on the Pier) and Audycja podzwrotnikowa (Subtropical Broadcast).

Television
WC Kwadrans (WC Fifteen Minutes) broadcast by the public Polish TV (TVP) (1994–1996) is his most widely known TV programme. The show was watched by three million viewers.

Cejrowski started his TV career by cooperating with Wojciech Mann in his Non Stop Kolor show (Non-stop Color) broadcast on Polish TV (1992–1994). He also was the host of the Stajnia show (The Stable) broadcast by the Polish TV and some local TV stations. Between 1996 and 1997 Cejrowski recorded a series of 30 episodes reporting on his journey to South America for TV Niepokalanów (now called TV Puls).

While at RTL 7 since 1997, Cejrowski, along with Jan Pietrzak, Jan Tadeusz Stanisławski, Krzysztof Daukszewicz and others, participated in a satirist talk show focused on various aspects of daily life in Poland. Between 1999 and 2000 Cejrowski co-hosted with Alicja Resich-Modlińska a talk show Piękny i Bestia (Beauty and the Beast).

While at Polsat (2003-4) Cejrowski hosted his own show Z kamerą wśród ludzi (With Camera Amongst the People also broadcast by TV 4 and Polsat 2). His highest level of publicity reached 2.5 million people – no. 4 record in Poland.

In 2008 Cejrowski started his popular Barefoot Around the World travel show (Boso przez świat), awarded the 2008 Travel & Tourism New York Festivals Gold World Medal.

Writing
Cejrowski writes and publishes quite a lot on social and political situations, including columns in Gazeta Polska, Tygodnik AWS, and Ilustrowany Kurier Polski, and on travel, including humorous reports in Newsweek, Rzeczpospolita, Poznaj Świat and others.

Political humor
 Kołtun się jeży (Mophead Stands on End)
 Młot na lewicę (The Hammer for the Left)
 Sól do oka (Salt into an Eye)

Travel writing
 Podróżnik WC (Traveler WC)
 Na końcu Orinoko (At the Orinoco's End)
 Gringo wśród dzikich plemion (Gringo Among the Wild Tribes)
 Rio Anaconda
 Wyspa na prerii (Island in the Prairie)

Travel
1985 – Cuba, Mexico – speleological expedition
1986 – Mexico – a documentary on the archeological stands of the Toltec culture
1986 – Mexico – Lacandons – descendants of the Maya
1987 – Mexico – a documentary on the archeological stands of the Maya
1987/88 – Mexico – Tribes on the Borderlines Between the Aztecs and the Maya
1989 – USSR – Orthodox Monastery – the Capitals of the Orthodox Church
1989 – Mexico – The Lost Tribe – Modern Descendants of the Indians
1990 – Guatemala, Honduras, Mexico – Mundo Maya
1990 – USSR – Life in the Communes
1990 – Caucasus – excursion
1991 – Costa Rica, Nicaragua, Honduras, El Salvador, Guatemala, Belize – Guerrilla – Under-ground Army, Rebels and Ordinary Gangsters
1991 – Guatemala – unknown Maya's ruins; descendants of the slaves of Jamaica
1992 – Texas/Mexico – Tribes on the Border – Tarahumara, Raramuri
1993 – USA – POW WOW. Modern Indian Rituals
1994 – Honduras, Mexico – Mosquito Indians project
1995 – Colombia – Kogi Indians
1996 – Panama/Colombia – Crossing Darién on foot; Choco and Kuna Indians
1997 – Venezuela/Brazil – Yanomami, Curripaco and Piaroa Indians
1997 – Australia – From Adelaide to York Peninsula
1998 – Venezuela/Colombia – Carapana Indians
1998 – USA/Canada/Mexico – Mennonites, Amish and Mormones
1999 – Guyana/Venezuela/Brazil – Last Wai Wai Indians
1999/2000 – Morocco – Ramadan
2000 – Paraguay/Brazil – Mennonici, Ache, Ayoreo, Nivacle Indians – Gran Chaco
2001 – Peru/Ecuador – through the Napo River; Sekoya tribe
2002 – Colombia, Peru, Brazil – Marubo, Mayoruna and Yagua tribes
2003 – Suriname/French Guiana/Brazil – Bush Negros, Wayana, Tirio and Wai Wai tribes
2004 – Israel/Palestinian territories – In the Footsteps of Jesus
2004 – Costa Rica/Panama – Garifuna – An African Tribe of the Caribbean
2005 – Peru – Following the Incas – Machu Picchu, Cuzco
2005 – Bolivia – Jesuit reductions on the Bolivian Chaco, by the Rio Madre de Dios to Peru
2007 – Senegal/Gambia/Cape Verde, Ecuador, Peru/Columbia/Brazil, Trinidad and Tobago
2008 – Mexico, Guatemala, Puerto Rico, Vanuatu archipelago, Tirol, Madagascar
2009 – Mexico, Venezuela, Thailand, Columbia/Ecuador/Peru, Brasil, Mexico, Guatemala
2010 – Japan / Australia / Fiji – "From the Indian Ocean to the Pacific"
2011 – Ethiopia 2011 – Israel / Palestine
2011/2012 – USA (Texas)
2015 – Paraguay/Mexico

Political views
In terms of his socio-political views, Cejrowski is Poland's most known journalist to openly advocate against the LGBT right movement. In his rhetoric, Cejrowski refers to LGBT people as "sodomites", "buggers", and "pederasts". In his article for "Dziennik" he notes that he "prefers wild people rather than gay parades". Cejrowski states that European society is overwhelmingly against homosexuality, and advocates for the institution of nationwide homosexuality clinics aiming to 'alter this disgusting behavior'. He says that "gay people should be pointed at, as the sin of sodomy evokes disgust".

In April 2008 Cejrowski announced his intention to abandon his Polish citizenship and acquire the Ecuadorian one instead, due to his disenchantment with the European Union, citing high taxes and problems with obtaining visas.

Cejrowski believes in creationism. He also advocates against vaccines.

In April 2021 a right-wing magazine Do Rzeczy published an interview with Cejrowski, expresses his contempt for Black Lives Matter movement, and his belief of the superiority of Christianity and Western civilization.

Religion 
Cejrowski is a hard line traditional Catholic. He states that as far as the Bible is concerned, he prefers The Old Testament – he likes when God is speaking to him directly, telling him what is good and what is sinful, and what to do. HE is also a known critic of the current Pope Francis, calling him a heretic.

Cejrowski postulates, that Catholic priests should be exempt from the rule of law in a given country, instead being accountable only to their church's hierarchy. He adds, that most priests who supposedly molested kids are gay, thus perpetuating the myth of gays being more prone to pedophilia than other sexual orientations.

Cejrowski is also strongly against abortion. In one of the interviews he said "I wish abortion clinics could burn down and abortion providers get shot".

See also 
Janusz Korwin-Mikke

References

External links
 http://www.cejrowski.com/en/cv/

1964 births
Living people
Fellows of the Royal Geographical Society
People from Elbląg
Polish conservatives
Polish anti-communists
Polish eurosceptics
Polish radio journalists
Polish Roman Catholics
Polish stand-up comedians
Polish television journalists
Polish travel writers